Lorna Laidlaw (born 1 February 1963) is an English actress. She has appeared on television as Mrs Tembe in the BBC medical soap opera Doctors and Aggie Bailey in the ITV soap opera Coronation Street. Laidlaw won the Royal Television Society award for Best Actress and Best Daytime Star at the Inside Soap Awards for her role in Doctors.

Career 
Laidlaw began her television career in 1994, with various guest appearances in series such as Blue Heaven, Playing the Field, Emmerdale and The Afternoon Play. In 2009, Laidlaw began portraying the recurring role of Miss Smiley in the CBeebies series Grandpa in My Pocket. Laidlaw left the series in 2014. Alongside these acting roles, she was also a co-presenter on the BBC children's series Tikkabilla from 2002 to 2007. From 2011 to 2019, Laidlaw portrayed the role of Mrs Tembe in the BBC soap opera Doctors. She was nominated for several awards for this role; including Best Actress for three years at The British Soap Awards. She also won the Royal Television Society award for Best Actress in 2012, as well as the award for Best Daytime Star at the Inside Soap Awards in 2017. In 2016, Laidlaw made her directorial debut when she directed three episodes of Doctors. On 8 January 2019, it was announced that she had left the role of Mrs Tembe, stating "the character was just fantastic but I think I'd done as much as I possibly could with her at that moment". In April 2019, it was announced that Laidlaw would be joining the cast of the ITV soap opera Coronation Street. She made her first appearance as Aggie Bailey on 12 June 2019.

Filmography

Awards and nominations

References

External links
 

1963 births
Actresses from Birmingham, West Midlands
Black British actresses
English film actresses
English soap opera actresses
English television actresses
Living people